The Robert Beaty Historic District is a historic district in Athens, Alabama.  Robert Beaty was one of the original founders of Athens.  An Irish immigrant who settled in Virginia, Beaty and his associates purchased 160 acres (65 ha) around a spring, and began subdividing the land for sale in 1818.  A small village of log structures had formed by 1826, and began to be replaced by permanent homes over the next decade.  Beaty's own house was completed in Federal style in 1826.  William Richardson, whose son William, Jr., served in the U.S. House of Representatives, completed his home the following year.  The district contains 86 contributing properties representing architectural styles including Federal, Greek Revival, Italianate, Eastlake, Victorian, and Spanish Colonial Revival.  The district was listed on the National Register of Historic Places in 1984.

References

National Register of Historic Places in Limestone County, Alabama
Historic districts in Limestone County, Alabama
Historic districts on the National Register of Historic Places in Alabama